Deux fillettes, fond jaune et rouge (Two Girls in a Yellow and Red Interior) (1947), oil on canvas, 61 x 49.8 cm (24 x 19 5/8 inches) is a painting by Henri Matisse in the collection of the Barnes Foundation, Merion, Pennsylvania. Albert Barnes became one of Matisse's most important patrons. In addition to a commissioned mural in 1932 Dance II, 1932 Barnes acquired many paintings and drawings by Matisse. Pierre Matisse who was Matisse's son living in New York City was instrumental in facilitating Barnes in purchasing works from his father. During the early-to-mid-1940s Matisse was in poor health. Eventually by 1950 he stopped painting in favor of his paper cutouts. This painting in the Barnes collection is an example of one of the final group of oil paintings in Matisse's career.

External links
 Image Retrieved online December 30, 2007

1947 paintings
Paintings by Henri Matisse
Collection of the Barnes Foundation
Food and drink paintings